On October 14, 2004, Pinnacle Airlines Flight 3701 (ICAO: FLG3701, IATA: 9E3701, or Flagship 3701) crashed near Jefferson City, Missouri, while flying from Little Rock National Airport to Minneapolis–Saint Paul International Airport. Flight 3701 was a repositioning flight with no passengers aboard; both pilots were killed. Federal investigators determined the crash was due to the pilots' unprofessional behavior and disregard for training and procedures.

Aircraft and crew  

Pinnacle Airlines Flight 3701, operating under the Northwest Airlink banner, was a repositioning flight of an empty 50-seat Bombardier CRJ200 (aircraft registration ). The aircraft was built in 2000 and had accumulated 10,168 hours of flight time and completed 9,613 flight cycles at the time of the crash.

On October 14, 2004, a different Pinnacle Airlines flight crew was scheduled to fly the incident aircraft from Little Rock National Airport to Minneapolis–Saint Paul International Airport, but this crew received an error message and aborted their take-off. Pinnacle Airlines dispatched maintenance crews to Little Rock to resolve the problem. The problem was identified and fixed. Because the aircraft was needed in Minneapolis the next morning, Flight 3701 was scheduled overnight as a repositioning flight, to move the plane from Little Rock to Minneapolis.

The only persons on board Flight 3701 were the two pilots, Captain Jesse Rhodes (31) and First Officer Peter Cesarz (23). Cesarz trained at Gulfstream Academy, and Rhodes trained at Embry–Riddle Aeronautical University, both in Florida. Both pilots flew for Gulfstream International Airlines before being hired for Pinnacle Airlines. Rhodes had logged a total of 6,900 flight hours, including 973 hours on the CRJ-200, and Cesarz had 761 hours, with 222 of them on the CRJ-200.

Accident 
Flight 3701 departed Little Rock at 21:21 Central Daylight Time (CDT). After departing Little Rock, the plane pitched up sharply several times during its ascent, briefly reaching .

Clearance was granted by air traffic control (ATC) at 21:36, and the plane climbed to its new cruising altitude shortly thereafter. At 21:54, the pilots began to struggle with control of their plane. Both engines lost power and the plane's stick shaker warned the pilots of an impending stall.

The pilots attempted to restart the engines, but could not do so. At 22:09, Flight 3701 asked ATC to direct them to the nearest airport for an emergency landing, and the controller on duty directed them to Jefferson City Memorial Airport in Jefferson City, Missouri. At 22:14, the pilots realized they were not going to reach the airport and began looking for a road or highway on which to land. 

Around 22:14, the captain was heard on the CVR stating that the gear should be up to avoid houses. About a minute later, the plane crashed into the ground outside Jefferson City. Both crew members were killed, but no casualties occurred on the ground.

Investigation 
The investigation into the accident focused mainly on information contained on the flight data recorder and the cockpit voice recorder. This is the official version of events as determined by that investigation.

Investigators determined that the two pilots were exploring the performance limits of the empty CRJ-200 on the flight.

This exceeded the manufacturer's recommended climb rate at altitudes above FL380. In the attempt to reach FL410, the plane was pulled up at over 1.2 g, and the angle of attack became excessive to maintain climb rate in the thinner upper atmosphere. After reaching FL410, the plane was cruising at  indicated airspeed, barely above stall speed, and had over-stressed the engines.

The plane's antistall devices activated while they were at altitude, but the pilots repeatedly overrode the automatic nose-down that would increase speed to prevent stall. After four overrides, both engines experienced flameout and shut down. The plane then stalled, and the pilots recovered from the stall at FL380 or  while still having no engine thrust. At that altitude, six diversion airports were within reach for a forced landing. This led the pilots to pitch nose down in an attempt to restart the engines, which requires a dive sharp enough to attain the required  airspeed for a windmill restart to make the blades in the turbines windmill at 10% N2 (turbine rotational speed). The captain did not take the necessary steps to ensure that the first officer achieved the needed airspeed or greater required for the windmill engine restart procedure and then did not demonstrate command authority by taking control of the airplane and accelerating it to at least that speed.

The crew ended the descent when they had reached  indicated airspeed, but neither engine core (N2) ever indicated any rotation during the entire descent. Since they were too high for an auxiliary power unit (APU) start, the ram air turbine (known as an "air-driven generator" on Bombardier products) was deployed to provide electric power for the aircraft, and the crew donned oxygen masks, as the cabin slowly depressurized due to loss of pressurization air from the engines.

This was again unsuccessful. They then declared to ATC that they had a single-engine flameout. At this point, they had four diversion airports available to them. They lost considerable altitude while continuing unsuccessfully to attempt to restart both the left engine (two times) and the right engine (two times) for over 14 minutes, using the emergency restart procedure. Despite their four auxiliary APU-assisted engine restart attempts, the pilots were unable to restart the engines because their cores had locked. Without core rotation, recovery from the double engine failure was not possible. At that point, the pilots finally declared to ATC that they had, in fact, lost both engines.

On January 9, 2007, the National Transportation Safety Board issued its final report on Flight 3701, which concluded that the probable causes of the accident were:
 The pilots' unprofessional behavior, deviation from standard operating procedures, and poor airmanship
 The pilots' failure to prepare for an emergency landing in a timely manner, including communicating with air traffic controllers immediately after the emergency about the loss of both engines and the availability of landing sites
 The pilots' improper management of the double engine failure checklist

Aftermath 
Thomas Palmer, former manager of Pinnacle Airlines' training program, said about the crash: "It's beyond belief that a professional air crew would act in that manner." After the accident, the airline restricted CRJ-200 flights to a maximum altitude of FL370. It also changed its training program to include ground school and simulator training in high-altitude operations. In the year following the accident, each Pinnacle pilot was given simulator training up to FL410 and shown what occurred on Flight 3701.

Pinnacle Airlines was renamed Endeavor Air in 2013 following Chapter 11 bankruptcy restructuring.

Notes

References

External links 
 Crash From Dual Engine Flameout Spurs Wide Ranging Review (Air Safety Week)
 ALPA responds to the crash of Pinnacle Flight 3701 – Air Line Pilot
 Accident Report – National Transportation Safety Board
 Full NTSB docket

2004 in Missouri
Airliner accidents and incidents in Missouri
Airliner accidents and incidents caused by pilot error
Aviation accidents and incidents in the United States in 2004
Cole County, Missouri
Disasters in Missouri
Jefferson City, Missouri
Accidents and incidents involving the Bombardier CRJ200
October 2004 events in the United States
Airliner accidents and incidents caused by engine failure
Airliner accidents and incidents involving in-flight depressurization
Aviation accidents and incidents in 2004